Provincial road N225 is a Dutch provincial road.

See also

References

External links

225
225